Parliamentary elections were held in Yugoslavia between 10 March and 10 May 1986 through a complicated delegate system which selected delegates to local, republic, and federal assemblies.

Background
The elections were the fourth held under the 1974 Yugoslav Constitution, approved on 31 January 1974, which established a bicameral Assembly with a Federal Chamber of 220 members and a Chamber of Republics and Provinces of 88 members.

Electoral system
The members of the Federal Chamber represented three groups: self-managing organizations, communities and socio-political organizations. 30 members were elected for the six republics and 20 for the two autonomous provinces, Kosovo and Vojvodina.

Election
The Federal Council was elected between 10 March and 21 April, and the Chamber of Republics and Provinces on 10 May. The Federal Executive Council was elected on 15 May, with Branko Mikulić as the President (Prime Minister). The Central Committee of the League of Communists of Yugoslavia was elected between 25 and 28 June, with Milanko Renovica as the President.

References

Yugoslavia
1986 in Yugoslavia
Elections in Yugoslavia
March 1986 events in Europe
May 1986 events in Europe
One-party elections